Sooner Lake is a reservoir in Pawnee and Noble counties in the U.S. state of Oklahoma. It was built in 1972 to serve as a reservoir of cooling water for a coal-fired power generation plant owned by Oklahoma Gas and Electric Company (OG&E). The plant is at the northwest end of the lake.

The lake is not far from the Arkansas River. It was originally filled by pumping water from the river and is maintained at the desired level the same way.

Sooner Lake includes a wildlife preserve and is the home to bald eagles during the winter months.  Eagle cameras have been placed at nesting sites and can be viewed online.

References

Reservoirs in Oklahoma
Bodies of water of Pawnee County, Oklahoma